Kot Ghulam Muhammad (formerly known as Jemesabad) is named after Ghulam Muhammad Khan Bhurgri,  the Tehsil situated in south-east Mirpur Khas District of the Southern Province Sindh in Pakistan. Kot Ghlam Muhammad Bhurgri is situated west of Samaro and north of Digri.

History
Kot Ghulam Muhammad Bhurgri was formerly known as Jamesabad, it was named after Captain H. E. M. James for his services in the Battle of Miani in Hyderabad. During British rule the town was renamed as Jamesabad earlier called Samaro

According to the 1901 census the population was 24,038 - an increase almost 5,000 since the 1891 (19,208). The density of 48 persons per square mile was considerably above the District average. The Taluka contained 184 villages, of which Jamesabad was headquarters. The land revenue and cesses 1903-4 amounted to 370,000.

The taluka has been renamed as Kot Ghulam Muhammad Bhurgri officially by Government of Sindh after Ghulam Muhammad Khan Bhurgari.

Ghulam Muhammad Khan Bhurgri is enlisted in Pioneers of Freedom for Pakistan. and was close friend to Mohammad Ali Jinnah the founder of Pakistan.

Profile

Town is situated on Mirpurkhas loop and it is also connected by road with Mirpurkhas, being at 30 miles from Mirpurkhas.

Education

Kot Ghulam Muhammad city has got one Government Boys Higher Secondary School, Government Girls Higher Secondary School, Primary Boys /Girls Schools 

In the Private sector, there are The Founders Institute, Ghazali Vision Higher Secondary School, Fauji Foundation Model School Kot Ghulam Muhammad, BAHRIA FOUNDATION COLLEGE KGM 

Town has one High School managed by Sindh Education foundation (SEF) 

Health
 
A Taluka headquarter hospital and many dispensaries and Basic Health Units are covering the health needs of the entire town area.

Though town is old one but it is well planned, almost all-street crosses are right angled, buildings are of pucca brick, and main roads are mettle and street bricks paved and C.C Roads.

Majority population of the Taluka lives in the rural areas, which are having the dearth of the ample sources of job avenues.

Geography
The city of Kot Ghulam Muhammad Bhurgari is situated on right bank of Jamrao canal branch of Nara canal coming from Indus river. The town situated on coordinates: 25°17′14"N 69°15′7"E.
 
Total area of Taluka is 192296 Sq:km.

Kot Ghlam Muhammad Bhurgari is situated in west of Taluka Samaro and north of Taluka Digri.

Demographics

Population

Kot Ghulam Muhammad Bhurgari Taluka is an important and biggest taluka of District Mirpurkhas, having population 273,193, according to Provisional Summary Results of 6th Population & Housing Census-2017,

Union Councils/Wards
Area and Estimated Population of Taluka/Town per Union Council

Now administratively Kot Ghulam Muhammad Bhurgari is subdivided into 14 Union Councils, after new delimitation by Election Commission of Pakistan.

Provisional census results for 2017 census 

			

Provisional total Population of Kot Ghulam Muhammad Bhurgri is about  having population 273,193.

Former Union Council Ghous Bux Bhurgri, also had status of Union council till 2001, status was abolished on political basis before 2001 Local bodies elections in the Country.

Communities 
Kot Ghulam Muhammad Bhurgri  is a small town where different communities are living. They speak languages of each other and every person has his due respect.

Sindhi, language is spoken by high majority in the town, other spoken languages are Gujarati, Siraiki, Urdu, Punjabi, Balochi, Brohi, [Marwari] and Kolhki.

In Muslims: Naghar Pathan, Syed, Noondani, Bhurgri, Talpur, Kumbhar, Khaskheli, Jat, Mahars, Sheedi, Laghari, Buledi, Halepoto, Chelia, Dall, Ramdan, Meo, Rajput, Arain, Qaimkhani, Mughal, Rao, Rangar, Halepota and Babbar and Baloch live frome in taluka as majority.

In Hindus:Menghwar, Birhaman (mahraj), Dewan (Maheshwari & Lohana), Khatri, Malhi, Kolhi and Bhel

Economy 

Majority population of Taluka lives in the rural areas, which are having the dearth of the ample sources of job avenues. Therefore are attached with agriculture and other seasonal crops.

Economically the status of common people comes under the poor class.

Kot Ghulam Muhammad Bhurgri economy is primarily based on agricultural, livestock 
and agribusiness or Agro Industries.

Crops like cotton, wheat, sugarcane, mango, banana, sapodilla or chikoo, Dundicut chillies and tomato are major agriculture products.
The main industries are agriculture based. The town has sugar mill, cotton factories. 
Tharparkar Sugar Mill Ltd is situated in the Kot Ghulam Muhammad Bhurgri town.

Like other talukas the Taluka of Kot Ghulam Muhammad Bhurgri is also agro based cum industrial area. It is having good network of cotton factories, floor mills, sugar Mil and ice factories. The majorities of population are engaged in agriculture and live stock fields. Where as some portion of population has access to transport, construction, wholesale and retail.

Renowned Agriculture farms in the town are Kachelo farms known as King of Mangoes.

Khair Mohammad Khan Bhurgri Mango farms, another grower from Mirpurkhas, after Kachhelos, who has developed a variety, which will produce fruit that extends the fruiting and harvesting season.

Basic Services 
Town has recently been installed with residential natural gas by Sui Southern Gas Company

Electrical power is provided by HESCO Hyderabad Electric Supply Company a distribution company of Water and Power Development Authority.

Khair Muhammad Bhurgri  132-KV Grid Station has been installed at Kot Ghulam Muhammad.

Town has a railway station property of Pakistan Railways

Pakistan Telecommunication Company Ltd provides land line phones & wireless phones.

Following cellular network operators operate the town.

 Mobilink	
Telenor
 Ufone
 Zong	
 Warid Pakistan

List of Government Medical faculties

TALUKA HOSPITAL, KOT GHULAM MUHAMMAD HOSPITAL

BHU KACHELO, DISPENSARY DISPENSARY

BHU KOT MIRS LANDHI BASIC HEALTH UNIT

BHU NAWAB COLONY BASIC HEALTH UNIT

BHU JHILURI BASIC HEALTH UNIT

BHU KACHELLO BASIC HEALTH UNIT

BHU MUHAMMAD HASHIM BHURGARI BASIC HEALTH UNIT

BHU BHUDIAL GARH BASIC HEALTH UNIT

BHU SIKRIYARI BASIC HEALTH UNIT

BHU UBEDULLAH BHURGARI BASIC HEALTH UNIT

BHU DENGAN BHURGARI BASIC HEALTH UNIT

Government 
Taluka Nazim (after local bodies election)

Member Provincial Assembly of Sindh Raees Noor Ahmed Bhurgri

Member National Assembly (Pakistan) Mir Munawar Ali Talpur

Gallery

See also
Bhurgri
Talpur
Sant Nenuram Ashram
Parbrahm Ashram

References

Mirpur Khas District
Populated places in Mirpur Khas District
Talukas of Sindh